Men from Earth is the fourth album by American country rock band The Ozark Mountain Daredevils. Founding band member Randle Chowning left to go solo after The Car Over The Lake Album and was replaced by Rune Walle in time for "Men From Earth".  The album includes a pair of standout Larry Lee tunes, the romantic "You Know Like I Know" and the hard-country "Homemade Wine". As their previous album had contained an EP called The Little Red Record, this release featured the even rarer  The Little Red Record 2 that contained two additional songs: "Roscoe's Rule" and "A Dollar's Worth Of Regular". These two tracks were included in the 2002 CD release of the album, along with "Better Days", which had only been released as the B side of their "Jackie Blue" single in late 1974.

Track listing
"Fly Away Home" (John Dillon)-2:50
"You Know Like I Know" (Larry Lee)-4:05
"Breakaway (From Those Chains)" (John Dillon)-4:00
"The Red Plum" (Steve Cash, John Dillon)-2:00
"Mountain Range" (John Dillon)4:46
"Watermill" (Steve Cash, John Dillon)-4:15
"Noah" (John Dillon)-3:06
"It's How You Think" (Larry Lee)-4:24
"Arroyo" (Steve Cash)-5:12
"Homemade Wine" (Larry Lee)-2:37

Charts

Personnel
John Dillon
Buddy Brayfield
Rune Walle
Steve Cash
Mike Granda
Larry Lee

Sidemen from Earth:
Bill Jones - Horns, Flutes & Synthesizer
Randle Chowning - Guitars & Vocals
Steve Canaday - Drums & Fair Witness
Connie Canaday - Vocals
Bean - Definition of Pachuco
Bobbye Hall - Congas & Percussion
Jerry Mills - Mandolin

Production
Quadrofonic Sound Studios. Nashville, Tennessee
American Artist Studio. Springfield, Missouri
Caribou Ranch. Nederland, Colo.
Engineered and mixed by: Marty Lewis
Mixed: at Caribou Ranch
Mastered: at Mastering Lab. Los Angeles, California
Produced by: David Anderle
Art Direction: Roland Young
Design: Junie Osaki
Photography: Jim Mayfield
Cover Photograph: Clarence & Roscoe Jones, taken June 1976 by Jim Mayfield

The Ozark Mountain Daredevils albums
1976 albums
Albums produced by Glyn Johns
Albums produced by David Anderle
A&M Records albums